XHEVC-FM is a radio station on 104.5 FM in Fortín, Veracruz. It is owned by Radio Cañón and carries a grupera format known as La Más Buena.

History
XHEVC received its concession on April 20, 1960 as XEVC-AM broadcasting on 700 kHz. It was owned by Carlos Ferraez Matos.

It migrated to FM in 2011.

References

Radio stations in Veracruz